The New Zealand red admiral (Vanessa gonerilla) is a butterfly endemic to New Zealand. Its Māori name is kahukura, which means "red cloak". The red admiral is a member of the family Nymphalidae, the subfamily Nymphalinae and the tribe Nymphalini. There are two subspecies: V. g. gonerilla, which occurs on the mainland of New Zealand, and V. g. ida, which occurs on the Chatham Islands.

Description
The red admiral is a medium-sized butterfly with a 50–60 mm wingspan. The top side of the forewings is mostly black, with a central bright red bar running back from the front edge. There are white spots, fringed with light blue, near the forewing tips. The rear wings are a dark reddish brown with a red patch containing four black circles; the centre of each circle is pale blue.

The underside of the rear wings is a mottled collection of white/brown/black shapes, which camouflages the butterfly when at rest. When revealed, the underside of the forewings display a striking blue eyespot bracketed by white and red arcs.

Distribution and threats
Red admirals are relatively common throughout New Zealand where their food plants occur. Anecdotal evidence suggest their numbers have been declining since the early 1900s, and the species has reportedly disappeared from Auckland. This is linked to spraying and the decline of native nettle plants, although nettle numbers are also affected by drought; nettle species are now being cultivated by NZ Forest & Bird and some councils as a butterfly food. Another factor in red admiral decline has been exotic parasitic wasps. The Australian white-spotted ichneumon wasp Echthromorpha intricatoria is self introduced, and the pteromalid wasp Pteromalus puparum was introduced by government entomologists in 1932–33 to control the adventive cabbage white butterfly (Pieris rapae), a serious agricultural pest in New Zealand. One study at Banks Peninsula noted that 1–19% of red admiral pupae were parasitised by P. puparum, and 20–30% by E. intricatoria.

Life cycle
The primary host plant for red admiral larvae is the native stinging nettle, ongaonga (Urtica ferox), although larvae can also eat other Urtica species. Throughout their life they use the nettle leaf to protect them during the day, by rolling the edge around them, or (as they get bigger) folding the leaf over into a 'tent'.

The green, barrel-shaped, ribbed eggs are generally laid singly on a leaf. The larva only eats enough of the eggshell to get out, whereas the closely related yellow admiral larva consumes the whole shell.

Larvae go through five growth stages (called instars). For about 10 days they have a brown body with small white spots and fine hairs (setae). At about 2.5 mm they moult and during this stage develop a pale stripe along the body just above the legs. The setae start to develop spikes, usually two or more at this stage. At about 5 mm long they moult again and the pale longitudinal lines become more obvious. At about 10 mm they moult once more, and the setae develop more spikes. The last moult is at about 22 mm, from where caterpillars grow to about 36 mm before pupating into a roughly 20–mm pupa.

It is difficult to tell red admiral and yellow admiral caterpillars apart: looking at the 4th and 6th body segments, the yellow admiral larva has a wider light coloured area than the red admiral. The pupa of the red admiral tends to be thinner and longer than that yellow admiral when compared side by side, but otherwise they are very difficult to distinguish.

Adult red admirals occur most frequently during summer. They over-winter as adults, so can be seen on warm winter days. They are long lived, surviving up to six months in the summer, and perhaps nine months for those which overwinter. The adults feed on nectar from various plant species (native and introduced) and occasionally on seepage of sap. They are strong fliers, but their short flights when feeding and ovipositing are very erratic. Flights over water or mountain ranges are straight and fast, characteristic of a migrating butterfly, but no migration within New Zealand has been reported.

See also
 Butterflies of New Zealand

References

External links
New Zealand red admiral discussed on RadioNZ Critter of the Week, 1 July 2016

Vanessa (butterfly)
Butterflies of Oceania
Endemic fauna of New Zealand
Butterflies of New Zealand
Butterflies described in 1775
Taxa named by Johan Christian Fabricius
Endemic insects of New Zealand